The Invention of Everything Else is a 2008 novel written by American author Samantha Hunt.  The novel presents a fictionalized account of the last days in the life of Nikola Tesla, the Serbian-American electrical engineer.  Other fictionalized versions of historical characters include Thomas Edison (a rival), George Westinghouse, and Mark Twain.  Tesla is the novel's protagonist along with a chambermaid named Louisa with whom he shares some common interests including science and pigeons.  Much of the book takes place in the New Yorker Hotel.  The book also includes elements of science fiction, namely time travel.

The author, Samantha Hunt, received a National Book Foundation award for authors under 35, for her previous novel, The Seas.  The Invention of Everything Else was shortlisted for an award from Believer magazine  and shortlisted for the Orange Prize. She won the Bard Fiction Prize for 2010.

References

External links 
 Audio recording of Samantha Hunt reading from The Invention of Everything Else at the Key West Literary Seminar, 2009
 Author's website
 New Yorker review
 San Francisco Chronicle review
 Globe and Mail review

2008 novels
Works about Nikola Tesla
Novels set in hotels
Fiction set in 1942
Fiction set in 1943
Novels set in New York City
Biographical novels